Claire Walsh may refer to:

 Claire Walsh (General Hospital)
 Claire Walsh (athlete) (born 1942), Irish middle-distance runner
 Claire Walsh (footballer) (born 1994), Irish footballer